Andrew Philip Parkin (born 12 December 1961) is a Welsh professional golfer who has also worked as a golf commentator and analyst.

Parkin was born in Doncaster, England, and raised in Newtown, Powys. He attended Texas A&M University in the United States, where he was the first person to receive a full scholarship for the university's golf team. He went on to become the first Aggie and first European to become 1st Team All-American. In 1983 he won The Amateur Championship to add to the British Youths Open Amateur Championship won the previous year, becoming the only player to hold both trophies at the same time. He appeared in the Walker Cup later that year, and turned professional after playing in the U.S. Masters in 1984.

Parkin was named the Sir Henry Cotton Rookie of the Year in his début season on the European Tour in 1984, having finished in 65th place on the Order of Merit despite only joining the tour in July. He earned enough money in his first event as a professional, during the 1984 Open Championship at St Andrews, to become the quickest affiliate member in the history of the European Tour. He ended the 1985 and 1986 seasons inside the top 35, even though he played less than 20 tournaments, both seasons, before he moved to the United States to play on the PGA Tour. He finished tied for 3rd at the PGA Tour Qualifying Tournament to earn his card for 1987. In his rookie season, he finished outside the top 200 on the money list to lose his playing rights, but did also play 14 events on the European Tour and retained his European Tour card. He returned to Europe with more success, twice making the top 100 on the European Tour Order of Merit. His form faded as he was troubled by an eye problem, which ended his playing career at the age of 31.

Parkin represented Wales 47 times on international teams including two World Cups, in 1984 and 1989 placing 4th and 5th respectively, and five Alfred Dunhill Cups, reaching two semi-finals. Since leaving the tour, Parkin has worked as a golf coach and as a commentator and analyst for many different broadcasters.

Amateur wins
1982 British Youths Open Amateur Championship, Tillman Trophy
1983 The Amateur Championship

Professional wins (1)
1986 Welsh Professional Championship

Results in major championships

Note: Parkin never played in the U.S. Open or the PGA Championship.

CUT = missed the half-way cut
"T" = tied

Team appearances
Amateur
Walker Cup (representing Great Britain & Ireland): 1983
European Amateur Team Championship (representing Wales): 1983
St Andrews Trophy (representing Great Britain & Ireland): 1984 (winners)

Professional
World Cup (representing Wales): 1984, 1989
Hennessy Cognac Cup (representing Wales): 1984
Dunhill Cup (representing Wales): 1985, 1986, 1989, 1990, 1991

See also
1986 PGA Tour Qualifying School graduates

References

External links

Welsh male golfers
Texas A&M Aggies men's golfers
European Tour golfers
PGA Tour golfers
British sports broadcasters
Golf writers and broadcasters
Sportspeople from Doncaster
People from Newtown, Powys
Sportspeople from Powys
1961 births
Living people